Breed of the West is a 1930 American Western film directed by Alan James, starring Hal Taliaferro, Virginia Brown Faire, and Buzz Barton.

Plot
Wally Weldon works as a ranch hand on Colonel Jim Sterner's ranch, reporting in to Longrope Wheeler, the foreman, and someone who Sterner trusts implicitly. One day while out on the range, Weldon comes across Jim Bradley, a young man who Weldon learns is searching for his father. Taking pity on the youth, he brings him back to the ranch, where he knows there's an opening as a cook's helper.

One day, Bradley walks in on Longrope and the cook trying to open Sterner's safe and rob him. Bradley attempts to get away, but is shot by the cook, who then attempts to flee himself. Weldon hunts the cook down and captures him, delivering him to the local sheriff. Back at the ranch, seeing Bradley in bed, Sterner realizes that he is his long lost son.

In jail the cook admits to shooting Bradley, and also tells the sheriff that he knows that Longrope was the man who murdered a cattle association representative. Weldon rushes back to the ranch, where he finds Longrope trying once again to open the safe. Weldon overpowers him, and takes him back to the sheriff.

Cast
 Hal Taliaferro (credited Wally Wales) as Wally Weldon
 Virginia Brown Faire as Betty Sterner
 Buzz Barton as Jim Sterner
 Robert Walker as Longrope Wheeler
 Lafe McKee as Colonel Sterner
 Bobby Dunn as Shorty
 George Gerwin as The cook
 Hank Bell as Sheriff Cole
 Edmund Cobb as Tom Hardy
 Bud Osborne as Harry Barnes
 Ben Corbett as Deputy
 Frank Ellis as Deputy
 Slim Whitaker as Henchman Slim
 Art Mix as Henchman Art
 Bob Burns as Cowboy Bob
 Fred Burns as Townsman

Production
Big 4 began casting the film in Mid-September 1930, in which Wally Wales was scheduled to star. They selected Bud Osborne and Edmund Cobb to join the cast. The picture was originally scheduled to be released on October 6. In early October the release date got pushed back to October 30, and finally pushed back again to November 12, which was the actual release date.

References

1930 Western (genre) films
1930 films
American black-and-white films
American Western (genre) films
Films directed by Alan James
1930s American films
1930s English-language films